Gek Poh MRT station is a future elevated Mass Rapid Transit (MRT) station along the Jurong Region line in Jurong West, Singapore.

History
On 9 May 2018, LTA announced that Gek Poh station would be part of the proposed Jurong Region line (JRL). The station will be constructed as part of Phase 1, JRL (West), consisting of 10 stations between Choa Chu Kang, Boon Lay and Tawas, and is expected to be completed in 2027.

Construction will start in 2020, with completion in 2027. Contract J107 also includes the design and construction of Tawas, and associated viaducts.

Initially expected to open in 2026, the restrictions on the construction due to the COVID-19 pandemic has led to delays in the JRL line completion, and the date was pushed to 2027.

Location
The station complex will be straddled over the existing Jurong West Street 75, between the junction with Jurong West Street 74, and the junction with Jurong West Avenue 5 and Jurong West Street 82. It is located within the Jurong West planning area in the Yunan Subzone, nested by multiple housing estates, with Gek Poh Shopping Centre and Gek Poh Ville Community Club to the north.

Access to the station will be via 3 exits on each side of Jurong West Street 75.

References

Mass Rapid Transit (Singapore) stations
Proposed railway stations in Singapore
Railway stations scheduled to open in 2027